Boman Shroff was an actor, stunstman, director, writer, producer in Hindi cinema, in the silent era and the early talkies.

Boman started working in Hindi movies prior to Talkies and was on monthly payroll of JBH Wadia and Homi Wadia's various movie production houses. In mid thirties when Wadia brothers started making populist action movies Boman's roles came to prominence. 1935 Wadia Movietone production, Hunterwali starring Fearless Nadia was a big hit and career defining movie for everyone involved including Boman, the male lead.

Filmography

As an Actor
 (1948) Tigress 
 (1947) Toofani Tirandaz 
 (1946) Flying Prince 
 (1946) Sher-E-Baghdad 
 (1940) Diamond Queen
 (1940) Hind Ka Lal 
 (1937) Toofani Tarzan
 (1935) Desh Deepak 
 (1935) The Princess and the Hunter 
 (1934) Bag-E-Misar 
 (1933) Lal-e-Yaman
As a Writer
 (1953) Jungle Ka Jawahar 
 (1949) The Palace of Illusions 
 (1947) Toofani Tirandaz 
 (1946) Sher-E-Baghdad 

As an Assistant Director
 (1946) Flying Prince 
 (1946) Sher-E-Baghdad
 (1942) Jungle Princess
 (1936) Miss Frontier Mail 
As part of the Miscellaneous Crew
 (1968) Khilari
 (1967) Lav-Kush 
 (1959) Circus Queen 
As a Production Manager
 (1960) Bombai Ka Babu
 (1958) Zimbo
As a Director
 (1947) Toofani Tirandaz

References

External links

20th-century Indian film directors
Indian silent film producers
Hindi-language film directors
Parsi people
Year of birth missing
Year of death missing
Place of birth missing
Place of death missing
Indian male film actors
Indian stunt performers
Indian male silent film actors